Rosa Smester Marrero (August 30, 1874 - February 15, 1945) was an educator and writer from the Dominican Republic. She became prominent for her feminist writings and opposition to the United States' occupation of the Dominican Republic. Her career as a teacher rendered her a prolific figure in her home city of Santiago de los Caballeros, where she founded a school and the St Vincent de Paul Hospice.

Early life 
Smester was born in Santiago de los Caballeros, Dominican Republic, on August 30, 1874. She was the daughter of Paul Emmanuel "Pablo" Smester and Dolores Trinidad "Dada" Marrero. Her father was born in Pointe-à-Pitre in Guadeloupe, and moved from Haiti to Santiago in 1870 to work as a German, English and Italian translator.

Smester was self-taught and educated at home by her mother. She recalled that her mother taught her the tenths of Juan Antonio Alix and reading from her favourite book, La Historia Sagrada.

Teaching career 
In 1897, Smester began teaching French to children at home, where she credited the discovery of her vocation. By 1902, she had become a syntax, literature, history and French teacher at the ladies' high school of Santiago. She resigned in 1908 and founded a school in Santiago in 1913.

In 1913, Smester moved to Monte Cristi. In that city was born her son, Federico Máximo Smester, from her marriage to Juan Grullón. As a teacher at the Higher Normal School of Montecristi, a teacher training college, she prepared the first group of Normal Teachers. She directed the Higher School of Ladies of Montecristi. 

She was a member of the Amantes de la Luz society, a library and archive.

Writings 

Smester's writings are scattered across magazines and journals. She never fulfilled her ambition to write a book, though she published a short story entitled Juan de Dios. Her prose conveys a deep religiosity and Christian conviction.

Opposition to the American occupation 
With the Junta Patriótica de Damas, Smester was one of many women who publicly agitated against the United States occupation of the Dominican Republic, which took place between 1916 and 1924. Smester expressed her opposition in the national press, publishing in literary magazines in Santiago. One of Smester's appeals for the removal of American forces read:

Smester refused to speak English as a form of civil resistance. In May 1920, Smester donated a month's salary to a nationalist cause, writing to Francisco Henríquez y Carvajal, the President of the Nationalist Board, that “whenever necessary, I will give gladly”.

Feminism 

In 1926, Smester wrote to Petronila Angélica Gómez, founder of Fémina, the first feminist Dominican journal, that "your magazine is the only genuine feminine, genuinely Dominican, and therefore deserving of the greatest help." In the same year, Smester requested to publish in the magazine, and so recorded her first two contributions to feminist journalism, publishing a further article in 1929. She became one of the magazine's main contributors.

Of the three articles written by Smester for Fémina, two concerned the masculine condition. Smester contributed to a broader feminist position that pacifist strategies disqualify androcentric warmongering, thereby including female voices in war discourses, such that "honoring and glorifying enlightened men is a form of patriotic love". In her 1929 article Así Es, Smester praised Francisco Henríquez y Carvajal's intellectual attributes, which lent him to be an "enlightened" feminist man.

In her Escrito Pro-Feminismo, Smester wrote that feminism has proven to be "essentially constructive", tending "to widen the sphere of action of the woman, to bring into play the activity of her spirit, to develop all her capacity", all without harming "the home and family".

In a conference speech to the cultural society Renovación of Puerto Plata, Smester explained her view that feminism "tries to intensify the femininity in women". By campaigning for women to be as cultured as men, feminism allows women to "be the best collaborator of man to attenuate human miseries and achieve world peace".

Smester praised women "as the greatest spiritual force in the world". Tracing the role of women through the Bible, she situated Eve's act of offering Adam the knowledge of good and evil as "the first act that takes place in paradise [that] marks the eternal and indisputable influence of women". Smester claimed that men would be "born as a turnip" without women and live in a world with neither pleasure nor suffering. Finally, women "are essentially and potently equal to men", and while men have historically dominated humanity's cultural output, a woman's self-denial and "her ability to love and suffer and to shape man in her bosom" brings women "to the same level [as men] if not higher".

In her Elogio a la Madre, Smester wrote that while a woman can be unsurpassable as a teacher or pharmacist, her "highest glory and most certain triumph" is as a mother. In her speech in Puerto Plata, she called motherhood a woman's "true mission, her highest prerogative" and a woman's life devoid of maternal work "useless". For Smester, supporting feminism and emancipation "do nothing against the mysterious instinct of motherhood".

Smester pitied "masculine women", calling the case of tomboys a "natural aberration [that] deserves compassion". She advocated complementary gender roles:

Teaching 
In Una Educacionista Notabile, Smester praised the work of Josefa Goméz, an "enlightened and self-sacrificing" teacher who directed the graduate school at Salcedo, whom Smester credited for increasing the city's level of education. She noted the increasing stature of the profession of teaching, and viewed a teacher's primary duty as instilling a moral education into their students:

Later life and death 
Smester chaired a chapter of the charitable Society of Saint Vincent de Paul. At her urging, in 1923, the La Caridad society, which had founded the first hospital in Santiago in 1891, established the 'St Vincent de Paul Branch' under her leadership, for the foundation of a nursing home in Santiago. Smester thus became the first director of the city's St Vincent de Paul Hospice. During this time, she lived in a Victorian house in the Calle del Sol, in front of the Parque Duarte.

From 1927 to 1937, Smester lived in Paris, accompanying her son at the beginning of his career as a doctor at the Sorbonne. She offered private classes while in Paris. Smester lectured at the University of Barcelona and spoke to the newly-founded , a women's group that called on her help as a cultural figure and influence.

Smester died on 15 February 1945.

Legacy 
During her life, the El Regional newspaper of Monte Cristi asked Smester to be honoured as the 'Illustrious Daughter' of the city "as a teacher, mother, and fighter". While she was in Paris, an editorial of the Santiago newspaper La Información, which cited Smester as a founding intellectual influence, said she had "one of the most outstanding intellectual capacities", and was "one of the best literary pens the Republic has".

A street in Santo Domingo bears Smester's name. In Santiago, a housing development was named after her. In Monte Cristi, an educational establishment was named the Rosa Smester Basic School.

Smester educated former Dominican President Joaquín Balaguer. Balaguer recalled Smester's great influence on his intellectual formation in his memoirs. Smester also taught Dominican artist Federico Izquierdo, a fellow member and later President of the Amantes de la Luz society, who was greatly pained by her death.

A 1982 poem by Dominican poet Armando Oscar paid tribute to Smester: "[She] went towards the conquest of ethical values [...] On her heart, she carried a crucifix [...] She was a woman, a believer above all else \ And God crowned her with the pain of a son!"

In its 2016 International Women's Day celebrations, the Constitutional Court of the Dominican Republic named Smester among sixty-three "outstanding Dominican women in the struggles for peace and democracy".

Notes

References

Further reading 
 
 

1874 births
1945 deaths
People from Santiago de los Caballeros
Dominican Republic women writers
20th-century Dominican Republic writers
Dominican Republic feminists